Sandy Bay Water Aerodrome  is located adjacent to Sandy Bay, Saskatchewan, Canada on the shore of Wasawakasik Lake.

See also 
 List of airports in Saskatchewan
 Sandy Bay Airport

References

Registered aerodromes in Saskatchewan
Seaplane bases in Saskatchewan